The International Institute for Applied Systems Analysis (IIASA) is an independent international research institute located in Laxenburg, near Vienna, in Austria. Through its research programs and initiatives, the institute conducts policy-oriented interdisciplinary research into issues too large or complex to be solved by a single country or academic discipline. This includes pressing concerns that affect the future of humanity, such as climate change, energy security, population aging, and sustainable development. The results of IIASA research and the expertise of its researchers are made available to policymakers in countries around the world to help them produce effective policies that will enable them to face these challenges.

Organization 
IIASA has over 400 researchers from 52 countries that work in Laxenburg, and an extensive network of collaborators, alumni, and visitors from across the globe.

The institute is currently directed by Albert van Jaarsveld. Wolfgang Lutz is the current Interim Deputy Director General for Science. Past directors have included Howard Raiffa, professor at Harvard's Business School and Kennedy School of Government, Roger Levien, former vice president for Strategy at Xerox, Leen Hordijk, former Director at the Institute for Environment and Sustainability, Joint Research Centre, European Commission, Ispra, Italy, and Detlof von Winterfeldt, professor at the University of Southern California.

IIASA is a non-governmental institution funded by scientific organizations in its member countries, which currently include: Austria, Brazil, China, Egypt, Finland, Germany, India, Indonesia, Iran, Israel, Japan, Republic of Korea, Malaysia (Observer), Mexico, Norway, Russia, Slovakia, South Africa, Sweden, Ukraine, the United Kingdom, the US, and Vietnam. Funding for the institute also comes from contracts, grants, and donations from governments, international organizations, academia, business, and individuals. Its research is independent and completely unconstrained by political or national self-interest.

History 
On 4 October 1972 representatives of the Soviet Union, United States, and ten other countries from the Eastern and Western blocs met at The Royal Society in London to sign the charter establishing IIASA. It was the culmination of six years’ effort driven forward by both the US President Lyndon Johnson and the USSR Premier Alexei Kosygin. For IIASA it was the beginning of a remarkable project to use scientific cooperation to build bridges across the Cold War divide and to confront growing global problems on a truly international scale. The first scientist had arrived at IIASA in June 1973.

IIASA built international multidisciplinary teams to confront innumerable global challenges, both long-standing and emerging. For example, a study on water pollution carried out in the 1980s by a team of IIASA chemists, biologists, and economists still forms the basis of modern water policy design in Japan, USA, and the former USSR. 

IIASA had shown the scientific benefits of bringing together different nationalities and disciplines to work toward common goals. Indeed, this approach has been widely imitated, for example, in the Intergovernmental Panel on Climate Change and the International Geosphere-Biosphere Programme.

Instead of closing in the 1990s, the institute broadened its mandate from the East and West to a truly global focus. Today, IIASA brings together a wide range of scientific skills to provide science-based insights into critical policy issues in international and national debates on global change.

Current research 
The IIASA mission is to provide scientific guidance to policymakers by finding solutions to global problems through applied systems analysis in order to improve human wellbeing and protect the environment.

In 2010, IIASA launched a new strategic plan for the next ten years, which focuses on three general problem areas: Energy and Climate Change, Food and Water, and Poverty and Equity.

There are currently nine IIASA research programs carrying out research into the dynamics of global change. These programs use holistic approaches and effective, interdisciplinary collaborations to identify the multiple solutions needed to bring about a global transformation to true sustainability: Advanced Systems Analysis, Air Quality and Greenhouse Gases, Ecosystem Services and Management, Energy, Evolution and Ecology, Risk and Resilience, Transitions to New Technologies, Water, and World Population.

Major projects 

Ten IIASA scientists were among the authors of the IPCC Fourth Assessment Report (the work of the IPCC, including the contributions of many scientists, was recognized by the joint award of the 2007 Nobel Peace Prize).[11] IIASA researchers are major contributors to Working Groups II and III of the IPCC Fifth Assessment Report and are invited contributors to Working Groups I, II and III of the IPCC Sixth Assessment Report.

The Greenhouse Gases – Air Pollution Interactions and Synergies (GAINS) model was launched in 2006 as an extension to the RAINS model which is used to assess cost-effective response strategies for combating air pollution, such as fine particles and ground-level ozone. The Chinese Government officially adopted GAINS in 2019 to strengthen air quality management in the country.

The IIASA led Arctic Futures Initiative (AFI), in collaboration with the Finnish Ministry of Foreign Affairs culminated in a report, which, considered how different Arctic actors define and address issues around the human dimension, governance, international cooperation, environmental protection, pollution, climate change, security, safety, economy, tourism, infrastructure, and science and education.

IIASA is a core member of the Food and Land Use (FOLU) Coalition that brings together stakeholders from academia and the public and private sectors to identify and advance solutions that deliver food security, healthy and affordable diets, halt biodiversity loss, restore and protect ecosystem services, and mitigate climate change and environmental pollution.

A partnership with the Global Environment Facility and the UN Industrial Development Organization - the Integrated Solutions for Water, Energy, and Land (ISWEL) project developed tools and capacities for the cohesive management of water, energy, and land resources in the Indus and Zambezi basins.

Together with the Sustainable Development Solutions Network (SDSN), IIASA initiated the Food Agriculture Land Use Biodiversity and Energy (FABLE) Consortium as a knowledge platform. FABLE brings together research and policy teams from 20 developed and developing countries to advance analytical tools and model-aided decision support to analyze the ability of development pathways to meet national aspirations, while also collectively aligning with, among others, the Sustainable Development Goals (SDGs) and the Paris Agreement.

The IIASA Challenges and Opportunities for Economic Integration within a wider European and Eurasian Space project served as a unique, depoliticized platform where key stakeholders could engage in evidence-based dialogue. In 2018, the project published three reports containing analyses and recommendations in several important areas: the first report compared product standards and technical regulations in the region and revealed that the EAEU has already adopted international standards more fully than previously realized, the second report on foreign direct investment highlighted that capital flows between the EU and Russia are declining. In the short-term, reducing administrative barriers could realistically help to improve the situation, and the third report looked at trans-Eurasian land transport corridors and argued that enhancing trade between Europe and Asia will require increased capacity, the removal of infrastructure bottlenecks, harmonization of regulatory environments, and enhanced associated investments.

Since 2010, IIASA is also one of the three "pillar institutions" of the Wittgenstein Centre for Demography and Global Human Capital.

The Global Energy Assessment was released in 2012. The report was a result of collaborative and integrated work of over 500 authors, analysts and reviewers worldwide who contributed independent, scientifically based and policy-relevant analysis of current and emerging energy issues and options. The assessment provides an analysis of energy-related issues including sustainable development, including poverty eradication, climate change mitigation, health, energy security, and energy access.[14]

Further reading

See also 
 All Union Scientific Research Institute for Applied Automated Systems (VNIIPAS/ВНИИПАС)
 Club of Rome

References

External links 

 Official site of IIASA

International climate change organizations
Environmental economics
International research institutes
Members of the International Council for Science
Non-profit organisations based in Austria
Research institutes in Austria
Systems thinking
Systems science institutes
Members of the International Science Council